James Mitchell may refer to:

Entertainment
 James Mitchell (actor) (1920–2010), American actor who played Palmer Cortlandt on All My Children
 James Mitchell (writer) (1926–2002), British writer whose works include the TV series Callan and When The Boat Comes In
 James "Jim" Mitchell, American porn director who killed his brother; see Mitchell brothers
 James Leslie Mitchell, British author who used the pseudonym Lewis Grassic Gibbon

Politics
 James Mitchell (Australian politician) (1866–1951), Premier of Western Australia 1919–1924 and 1930–1933
 James Mitchell (Canadian politician) (1843–1897), legislator from New Brunswick
 James Mitchell (Covenanter) (died 1678), Scottish fanatic who tried to murder an archbishop
 James Mitchell (loyalist) (1920–2008), Ulster loyalist and Royal Ulster Constabulary officer
 James Mitchell (New South Wales politician) (1789 or 1792–1869), New South Wales surgeon, businessman and politician
 James Coffield Mitchell (1786–1843), U.S. Congressman from Tennessee
 James Fitz-Allen Mitchell (1931–2021), prime minister of Saint Vincent and the Grenadines
 James George Mitchell (1847–1919), Pennsylvania state senator and United States soldier
 James L. Mitchell (1834–1894), mayor of Indianapolis, Indiana
 James P. Mitchell (1900–1964), American politician, Secretary of Labor in the Eisenhower administration
 James S. Mitchell (1784–1844), U.S. congressman from Pennsylvania
 James Mitchell (Arkansas politician), served in Arkansas General Assembly, 1860

Sports
 James Mitchell (American football) (born 1999), American football player
 James Mitchell (athlete), American athlete who competed in the 1904 Summer Olympics
 James Mitchell (basketball) (born 1991), Australian basketball player
 James Mitchell (footballer, born 1880) (1880–1958), Scottish footballer for Kilmarnock and Scotland
 James Mitchell (footballer, born 1897) (1897–1975), English international footballer
 James Mitchell (rugby union) (born 1995), English rugby player
 James Mitchell (wrestling) (born 1965), American wrestling manager

Other
 James Mitchell (herald) (1836–1898), Scottish officer of arms
 James Mitchell (Methodist minister) (1818–1903), also Commissioner of Emigration
 James Mitchell (poker player) (born 1989), English poker player
 James Mitchell (Scottish minister) (1830–1911), Scottish minister and social organizer
 James C. Mitchell (settler) (1810–1860), founder of the town of Florence, Nebraska
 J. Clyde Mitchell (1918–1995), British anthropologist
 James Elmer Mitchell (born 1952), American psychologist and interrogation consultant
 James G. Mitchell (born 1943), Canadian computer scientist
 James Hart Mitchell (1899–1921), English World War I flying ace
 James T. Mitchell (1834–1915), Chief Justice of the Pennsylvania Supreme Court

See also
 Jamie Mitchell (disambiguation)
 Jim Mitchell (disambiguation)